Paradiso railway station is a railway station in the commune of Wiltz, in north-western Luxembourg.  It is located in the countryside, isolated from the town of Wiltz, but serves several sites of the Wiltz International Scout Centre.  It is operated by Chemins de Fer Luxembourgeois, the state-owned railway company.

Service
The station is situated on a branch of Line 10, which connects Luxembourg City to the centre and north of the country. Paradiso is the second station on the branch, which terminates at Wiltz.

References

External links
 Official CFL page on Paradiso station
 Rail.lu page on Paradiso station

Buildings and structures in Wiltz
Railway stations in Luxembourg
Railway stations on CFL Line 10